Workington Town R.L.F.C. is a semi-professional rugby league club playing in Workington in west Cumbria.

Their stadium is Derwent Park, which they share with Workington Comets, a speedway team.

They became Rugby League Champions in 1951 and also won the Challenge Cup in 1952. Their nickname is simply 'Town', though they are sometimes referred to as 'Worky' by fans of other teams. Their local rivals are Whitehaven, who joined the league three years after Workington Town.

History

1944–1945: Establishment

Workington Town RLFC was formed at a meeting held in the Royal Oak Hotel, Workington in December 1944. Many of Workington Town's board came from local football team Workington AFC's board and the team would ground share with "the Reds" at Borough Park. It was decided at the meeting that the club should be registered as a business and that an application for membership of the Rugby Football League should be submitted. From those in attendance at that meeting the first board of directors was formed and the application for membership was agreed at a meeting held on 23 January 1945 at the Grosvenor Hotel, Manchester. They were the first side from Cumberland to enter the professional rugby league.

They first played their home games, wearing green and red hoops, at Borough Park. The first match against Broughton Rangers on Saturday 25 August 1945 attracted a crowd of 4,100 to Borough Park. Workington went on to win 27–5.

In their first season, they achieved the distinction of losing to an amateur side, Sharlston Rovers in the first round of the Challenge Cup, a very rare occurrence in those days. However, the first round was a two leg affair, and they were able to make amends in the return leg and progress to the second round.

1946–1969: Golden era
Gus Risman joined Workington Town as player-coach in August 1946 when they had been in the Northern Rugby League for only one season. In his eight years at the club, he made them into a team capable of beating Wigan or anyone else in the league. There was a club record 20,403 for the third round Cup game against St. Helens. Town finished third of 29 clubs but had a tough draw; the only Yorkshire teams they played were Bradford, Leeds, Halifax, Keighley and York. They played these five home and away as well as all the teams from Lancashire. All the top four that season were all from the Western side of the Pennines and Workington went on to become rugby league champions in 1951. After sensationally beating reigning champions Wigan by 8-5 away at Central Park in the playoff semi final, Town became champions themselves for the one, and so far only, time by beating Warrington in the final held at Maine Road, Manchester by 26-11. Warrington raced into an early 8-0 lead after 30 mins before a try from Paskins and 2 tries each from Gibson and Wilson, supplemented by 3 goal kicks from Risman, brought the title to Cumbria.

The following season they then beat Featherstone Rovers 18–10 in front of a crowd of 72,093 at Wembley Stadium to become Challenge Cup winners; this was the first final to be televised. No other club, before or after, has lifted both these trophies within such a short period of their formation. During the 1954–55 season, Workington Town made it to the Challenge Cup final but were beaten 21–12 by Barrow. Owing to tension between the football club's manager Bill Shankly and the Town manager, Gus Risman and director Tom Mitchell, Town took a 150-year lease on the land at Derwent Park and built a new stadium. They moved out of Borough Park in 1956.

Workington Town lost in the 1958 Challenge Cup final to Wigan and one week later, they lost in the Championship final at Odsal Stadium, Bradford.

In 1962, the league was split into East and West of the Pennines; Widnes and Workington Town met at Central Park, Wigan, in the first final of the Western Division Championship on Saturday 10 November 1962. With two minutes remaining, Syd Lowdon dropped a goal to earn Workington a 9–9 draw. Later in the month Workington won the replay 10–0.

The record attendance at Derwent Park was set in 1965 when 17,741 spectators turned up for a third round Challenge Cup match against Wigan.

1970–1995
The early 1970s brought demise of Town as a power in the game and the fans dropped off making it very difficult for the management to come up with the cash to bring in top class players who were being enticed out of the county to other clubs. Paul Charlton took over as player-coach in 1975 and guided them to promotion. Local players returned to the club and a team consisting mainly of home grown players started to bring back glory to the Town by appearing in a Lancashire County Cup Final in October 1976. They appeared in a further three finals in consecutive season winning the trophy by defeating Wigan in the 1977 final.

The last of those four finals was staged at Salford's Willows ground on Saturday 8 December 1979, and attracted a crowd of 6,887. Widnes were firm favourites to lift the cup and held the Cumbrians at bay to register an 11–0 victory. Probably as a result of the three previous finals, several top class forwards caught the eye of the wealthy Lancashire clubs who enticed them away from Derwent Park.

Tommy Bishop was coach between 1981 and 1982. The 1980s were the lowest era in the club's history as it saw Town mainly as a yo-yo side going in and out of the first division but mostly wallowing halfway down the second. During this period, the fan base practically disappeared, and as the 1990s arrived it was third division rugby status.

Peter Walsh joined Town as Head Coach in the summer of 1992. Town were beaten finalists in the 1992–93 Divisional Premiership going down to Featherstone Rovers while in the Third Division. Workington won the Second Division Championship and Divisional Premiership trophy double in 1993–94, the Divisional Premiership was won over London Crusaders at Old Trafford, Manchester. That took them into the top flight of rugby league and Town finished ninth in the Stones Bitter Championship. Peter Walsh quit as the coach of Workington Town to return to Australia in July 1995.

1996–present: Summer era
When the Super League was set up, it was proposed that Workington merge with Barrow, Carlisle and Whitehaven to form a Cumbrian super club to be based at Workington. This was, however, resisted and an unmerged Workington took part in Super League but would record only two wins all season. They finished bottom of the table and were relegated to the Northern Ford Premiership with significant debts.

In 2002 Town dropped into National League Two as a result of losing to Dewsbury in what was the fore-runner of the National League Two Grand Final. Billy McGinty took over as coach on 25 May 2003.

In 2003, Ged Stokes was in charge of the New Zealand A-team on their tour of England. At the end of the tour, he was offered the vacant coaching job at Town. Workington were at a low ebb and had only seven players in their squad.

A Challenge Cup game against Leeds brought a large crowd that allowed the club to clear their debts.  Assistant coaches Craig Barker and Les Ashe took over and led the team to the Elimination Semi-final but they were defeated by Oldham. A few weeks after Town's 2007 season had come to a close, Town appointed Whitehaven coach Dave Rotheram as their new coach. In Rotheram's first season in charge Town finished eighth in National League Two with only six wins from their twenty two games and were eliminated in the first round of the play-offs at Keighley.

Following a poor start to the 2009 season, with Town only gaining two wins up to that point, Dave Rotherham decided to step down. He was replaced in July 2009 by joint coaches Martin Oglanby and Gary Charlton.

2011 was a much better year with Town reaching the 2011 Championship 1 Grand Final by defeating Keighley 19–10 in the elimination semi-final.
In 2021 Workington were promoted to the English Rugby League Championship, with a 36-12 win over Doncaster in the League 1 play-off final.
In Workington Town's first game back in the Championship, they were defeated 20-6 by Newcastle Thunder.
In the 2022 RFL Championship season, Workington Town were relegated back to League 1 after finishing bottom of the table. Workington managed to win only one match for the entire year.

Stadium

1944–1956: Borough Park

Workington moved into Borough Park in 1944 and shared it with association football club Workington AFC.  Owing to tension between the football club's manager Bill Shankly and the Town manager, Gus Risman and director Tom Mitchell, Town took a 150-year lease on the land at Derwent Park and moved out in 1956.

1956–present

Town built a stadium on the ground they squired after leaving Borough Park in 1956 and won the RFL Championship whilst playing there. The record attendance at Derwent Park was set in 1965 when 17,741 spectators turned up for a third round Challenge Cup match against Wigan. The football pitch at Derwent Park is surrounded by a  motorcycle speedway track.

The modern Workington side play at a far lower level than their 1950s equivalent. Although they have struggled to match earlier achievements, Town maintain a small but dedicated (and vocal) support. Also attracting some big name, former Super League players.

2022 squad

2023 transfers

Gains

Losses

Players

Players earning international caps while at Workington Town

 Harry Beverley won caps for England while at Dewsbury 1975 Australia, while at Workington 1979 Wales
 Edward "Eddie" Bowman won caps for Great Britain while at Workington 1977 France, New Zealand, Australia (2 matches)
 Paul Charlton won caps for England while at Salford 1975 France won caps for Great Britain while at Workington 1965 New Zealand, while at Salford 1970 New Zealand (sub), 1972 France (2 matches), Australia (2 matches), France, New Zealand, 1973 Australia (3 matches), 1974 France (2 matches), Australia (3 matches), New Zealand (3 matches) (World Cup 1970 1-cap, 1972 4-caps, 1-try)
 Gareth Dean won caps for Wales while at Wigan, unattached, Workington Town, AS Carcassonne, and Celtic Crusaders 2001...2007 7(10, 12?)-caps + 4-caps (sub)
 Brian Edgar won caps for England while at Workington 1962 France won caps for Great Britain while at Workington 1958 Australia, New Zealand, 1961 New Zealand, 1962 Australia (3 matches), New Zealand, 1965 New Zealand, 1966 Australia (3 matches)
 Kevin Ellis won caps for Wales while at Warrington, Workington Town, and Bridgend Blue Bulls 1991...2004 14(15?)-caps + 1-cap (sub) 2(5?)-tries (1-drop-goal?) 13(21?)-points
 David Fraisse won caps for France while at Workington 1995 ?-caps
 Bruce Gibbs won caps for Other Nationalities while at Workington circa-1975 ?-caps
 Edward "Eppie" Gibson won caps for England while at Workington 1947 France, 1951 Other Nationalities, Wales, 1953 Other Nationalities
 Ray Glastonbury won a cap for Wales while at Workington Town 1963 1-cap
 Leslie "Les" Gorley won caps for England while at Workington 1977 Wales, 1981 Wales (sub) won caps for Great Britain while at Widnes 1980 New Zealand, New Zealand (sub), 1981 France (2 matches), 1982 Australia
 James "Jimmy" Hayton won caps for England while at Workington 1949 Other Nationalities
 John Henderson won a cap for England while at Workington 1953 Wales
 Norman Herbert won caps for England while at Workington 1962 France won caps for Great Britain while at Workington 1961 New Zealand, 1962 France, Australia (3 matches), New Zealand
 Stephen Holgate won caps for England while at Workington 1995 France
 Lynn Hopkins won a cap for Wales while at Workington Town 1982 1-cap 1-goal 2-points
 Frederick "Fred" Hughes won caps for Wales while at Barrow, and Workington Town 1945...1946 3-caps
 William "Billy" Ivison won caps for England while at Workington in 1949 against Wales, and Other Nationalities, in 1951 against Other Nationalities, in 1952 against Other Nationalities, and won caps for British Empire XIII while at Workington Town on Wednesday 23 January 1952 against New Zealand at Stamford Bridge, and represented Great Britain while at Workington Town in 1952 against France (non-Test matches).[3]
 Mark Johnson won caps for South Africa while at Workington 1995 ?-caps
 John "Johnny" Lawrenson won caps for England while at Wigan: 1939 Wales, 1940 Wales, 1941 Wales, 1946 Wales (2 matches), 1948 Wales, France, 1949 Wales, Other Nationalities, while at Workington: 1950 [Opposition?] won caps for Great Britain while at Wigan 1948 Australia (3 matches)
 Vivian 'Vince' McKeating won caps for England while at Workington 1951 Wales, France won caps for Great Britain while at Workington 1951 New Zealand (2 matches)
 William "Bill" Martin won a cap for Great Britain while at Workington in 1962 against France
 John "Johnny" 'Rupert' Mudge won caps for Other Nationalities while at Workington Town circa-1951 ?-caps
 William "Bill" Pattinson won caps for England while at Workington 1981 France (sub), Wales
 Tony Paskins won caps for Other Nationalities while at Workington Town 1948...55 11-caps
 Albert Pepperell won a cap for British Empire XIII while at Workington in 1952 against New Zealand, and won caps for Great Britain while at Workington in 1950 against New Zealand, and in 1951 against New Zealand
 Rowland Phillips won caps for Wales while at Warrington, and, Workington Town 1991...1996(1998?) 7(15, 14?)-caps + 10-caps (sub) 2-tries 8-points
 John Risman won caps for Wales while at Workington Town 1978...1979 2(3?)-caps + 1-cap (sub)
 Ike Southward won caps for Great Britain while at Workington
 Raymond "Ray" Wilkins won caps for Wales while at Workington Town 1977 1(2?)-caps + 1-cap (sub)
 George 'Happy' Wilson caps won for South of Scotland (RU) while at Kelso RFC 1947, 3-caps won for Other Nationalities while at Workington, 3-caps won for Great Britain RL while at Workington 1951 New Zealand (3 matches) (signed for Workington [date?])

Other notable former players
These players have either; played in a Challenge Cup, or Rugby Football League Championship final, received a Testimonial match, are "Hall of Fame" inductees, played during Workington Town's Super League I season, or were international representatives before, or after, their time at Workington Town, or are notable outside of rugby league.

 Terrence "Terry" Ackerley (#9) circa-1962
 Harry Archer (#6) circa-1962...65
 Colin Armstrong circa-1990s
 David Beck (Wing, i.e. number 5) circa-1990 (Testimonial match 1988)
 Eric Bell (#3) circa-1965
 Edward "Eddie" Brennan (#4) circa-1962
 John "Jock" Carr (#5) circa-1948
 Anthony "Tony" Colloby (#5) circa-1965
 Des Drummond, 1993–95 – former Great Britain international
 Kevin Ellis, 1994–95, former Great Britain & Wales international.
 Colin Falcon (Hooker, i.e. number 9) circa-1990 (Testimonial match 1990)
 Ken Foord (to Parramatta circa-1961)
 Frank Foster
 Ken Goodall
 Peter Gorley (Younger brother of Leslie "Les" Gorley)
 Ian Hartley (Testimonial match 1985)
 Brad Hepi 1992–1995
 Douglas "Doug" Holland circa-1957
 Mike Jackson (to Parramatta circa-1962)
 Andrew "Andy" Key circa-1957
 Wayne Kitchin, son of Phil Kitchin
 William "Bill" Kirkbride circa-1965
 Danny Leatherbarrow
 David Lowden
 Sydney "Syd" Lowdon (#1) circa-1962
 William "Bill" Lymer circa-1957
 Dean Marwood circa-1990s
 Bill McCall (to Parramatta circa-1961)
 Iain MacCorquodale
 Matthew "Matt" McLeod
 John 'Spanky' McFarlane (#13) circa-1965
 'Big' Jim Mills
 Mark Mulligan, 1992–95, genius fullback from Australia
 Gary Nixon (Prop forward, i.e. number 8) circa-1990
 John "Loppylugs"/"Loppy" O'Neill (#3) circa-1958...62
 Martin Oglanby, winner of Division Two Player of the Year in 1994
 James Pickering circa-1990s
 Piet Pretorius (#5) circa-1962
 Garry Purdham, who died in the 2010 Cumbria Shootings
 Geoff Rea 1983–1989
 Gus Risman (Father of John Risman)
 Sol Roper (#7) circa-1957...62 (1958 Challenge Cup Captain)
 Anthony Samuel circa-1990s
 Gary Smith (Testimonial match 1994)
 Tony Smith 1996. Smith went on to coach Leeds Rhinos, Great Britain, England and Warrington Wolves.
 William "Billy" Smith (#7) circa-1965
 Bill Telford (#12) circa-1948
 Cecil "Cec" Thompson (#11/#12/#13)
 Arnold 'Boxer' Walker
 Ian Wright

Coaches
Also see :Category:Workington Town coaches.

 Gus Risman 1946–54
 Jim Brough 1955–58
 Ike Southward 1968
 Eppie Gibson 1971–73
 Paul Charlton 1975–?
 Tommy Bishop 1980–81
 Paul Charlton 1982
 Harry Archer 1983–84
 Billy Smith 1984–85
 Keith Davies 1986–87
 Maurice Bamford 1988
 Phil Kitchin 1989
 Ray Ashton
 Dean Williams
 Peter Walsh 1992–95
 Kurt Sorensen 1995–96
 Ross O'Reilly 1996–97
 Robbie Tew 1997
 Andy Platt 1999
 Gary Murdock 2000-02
 Martin Wood 2003
 Billy McGinty 2003
 Ged Stokes 2003–07
 Craig Barker and Les Ashe 2007
 Dave Rotheram 2007–09
 Gary Charlton andMartin Oglanby 2009–2013
 Gary Charlton 2014
 Phil Veivers 2014
 Leon Pryce 2018–2019
 Chris Thorman 2019-2022
 Anthony Murray 2023-present

Seasons

Super League era

Honours
Rugby Football League Championship: 1
1950–51
Challenge Cup: 1
1951–52
Lancashire County Cup: 1
1977–78
Western Division Championship: 1
1962–63
Cumberland League: 3
1906-07
1907-08
1908-09

References

External links 

 

 
Super League teams
Rugby league teams in Cumbria
Rugby clubs established in 1945
1945 establishments in England
English rugby league teams